Artur Andruszczak (born June 11, 1977) is a Polish footballer who currently plays for Chojniczanka Chojnice.

Career

Club
In January 2011, he joined Chojniczanka Chojnice on one and a half year contract.

References

External links
 

1977 births
Living people
Polish footballers
GKS Katowice players
Stilon Gorzów Wielkopolski players
Lechia Gdańsk players
Zagłębie Lubin players
Pogoń Szczecin players
Sportspeople from Gorzów Wielkopolski
Association football midfielders
Association football defenders